is a railway station in Fukagawa, Hokkaidō, Japan.

Lines
Hokkaido Railway Company
Hakodate Main Line Station A25

Adjacent stations

Railway stations in Hokkaido Prefecture
Railway stations in Japan opened in 1898